Hope Church is an Evangelical Presbyterian church in Cordova, a district of Memphis, Tennessee. Rev. Rufus Smith is the Senior Pastor, Rev. Eli Morris is the Senior Associate Pastor and Dr. R. Craig Strickland is the Founding Pastor. It describes itself as a "church for the unchurched". Hope is a part of the EPC (epc.org) denomination.

Theology
Hope Presbyterian Church is a member of the Evangelical Presbyterian Church denomination. The EPC website states:

References

Evangelical Presbyterian churches
Presbyterian churches in Tennessee
Churches in Shelby County, Tennessee